Federica Sanfilippo (born 24 October 1990) is a former Italian biathlete. She competed in the Biathlon World Cup, and represented Italy at the Biathlon World Championships 2016 in Holmenkollen.
She abruptly retired from Biathlon in 2023.

World Cup

Podiums

References 

1990 births
Living people
Italian female biathletes
Sportspeople from Sterzing
Olympic biathletes of Italy
Biathletes at the 2018 Winter Olympics
Biathletes at the 2022 Winter Olympics